The Western Australia Women cricket team, previously known as Western Fury, is the women's representative cricket team for the Australian State of Western Australia. They play their home games at WACA West Ground, Perth. They compete in the Women's National Cricket League (WNCL), the premier 50-over women's cricket tournament in Australia. They previously played in the now-defunct Australian Women's Twenty20 Cup and Australian Women's Cricket Championships.

History

1934–1935: Early history
Western Australia's first recorded match was a draw against England in a two-day tourist match from 24 to 26 November 1934.

1936–1996: Australian Women's Cricket Championships
Western Australia joined the Australian Women's Cricket Championships for the 1936–37 tournament. They continued to play in the Championships until its final season in 1995–96. Western Australia won the title on one occasion, in 1986–87.

1996–present: Women's National Cricket League and Twenty20 Cup
Western Australia joined the newly-established WNCL in 1996–97. They have won the title once, in 2019–20. Their best finish in the Australian Women's Twenty20 Cup was runners-up in 2012–13, when they lost the final to New South Wales by 5 wickets.

On 29 July 2019, the Western Australian Cricket Association announced that the name of the team would change from Western Fury to simply Western Australia Women, alongside a similar change to the men's team which dropped its "Warriors" nickname.

Grounds
Western Australia have used a number of grounds over the years. Their first recorded home match against England in 1934 was played at the WACA Ground, Perth. Historically they have played the vast majority of their home matches at various grounds in Perth. Outside Perth, they have played sporadic matches in other locations including Geraldton, Crawley, Fremantle and Baldivis.

After the inception of the WNCL in 1996, Western Australia began playing regular matches at the WACA Ground. They have also continued to use other grounds, most regularly Murdoch University West Oval in Perth. Their two 2019–20 WNCL home games and their four 2020–21 WNCL home games were played at the WACA Ground. They did not play any home matches in the 2021–22 WNCL due to COVID-19 restrictions. In the 2022–23 WNCL, they returned to playing all of their home matches at the WACA Ground.

Players

Current squad
Based on squad announced for the 2022/23 season. Players in bold have international caps.

Notable players
Players who have played for Western Australia and played internationally are listed below, in order of first international appearance (given in brackets):

 June James (1951)
 Marie McDonough (1958)
 Dawn Newman (1968)
 Joyce Goldsmith (1968)
 Betty McDonald (1973)
 Lynette Smith (1973)
 Wendy Hills (1976)
 Peta Verco (1977)
 Jill Powell (1979)
 Denise Emerson (1982)
 Denise Martin (1982)
 Terri Russell (1982)
 Rhonda Kendall (1982)
 Jenny Owens (1982)
 Karen Read (1982)
 Debbie Wilson (1984)
 Judy Esmond (1985)
 Frances Leonard (1986)
 Zoe Goss (1987)
 Avril Fahey (1995)
 Charlotte Edwards (1996)
 Cherie Bambury (1997)
 Sarah Collyer (1998)
 Kate Pulford (1999)
 Dawn Holden (1999)
 Nicky Shaw (1999)
 Laura Joyce (2001)
 Kate Oakenfold (2001)
 Jenny Gunn (2004)
 Kate Blackwell (2004)
 Suzie Bates (2006)
 Sarah Tsukigawa (2006)
 Sophie Devine (2006)
 Rene Farrell (2007)
 Lauren Ebsary (2008)
 Jess Duffin (2009)
 Elyse Villani (2009)
 Renee Chappell (2013)
 Amy Jones (2013)
 Tash Farrant (2013)
 Kate Cross (2013)
 Nicole Bolton (2014)
 Leigh Kasperek (2015)
 Beth Mooney (2016)
 Heather Graham (2019)
 Maia Bouchier (2021)
 Alana King (2022)

Coaching staff
 Head coach: Rebecca Grundy

Honours
Australian Women's Cricket Championships:
Winners (1): 1986–87
Women's National Cricket League:
Winners (1): 2019–20
Australian Women's Twenty20 Cup:
Winners (0):
Best finish: Runners-up (2012–13)

See also

Western Australian Cricket Association
Western Australia men's cricket team
Perth Scorchers (WBBL)
Cricket in Western Australia

References

 
Australian women's cricket teams
Cricket in Western Australia
Western Australia women's cricket team
Western Australia women's cricket team
Sporting clubs in Perth, Western Australia